was a Japanese physicist and Marxist who was internationally known for theoretical work on the subatomic particles. He proposed the two meson theory, the Sakata model (an early precursor to the quark model), and the Pontecorvo–Maki–Nakagawa–Sakata neutrino mixing matrix.

After the end of World War II, he joined other physicists in campaigning for the peaceful uses of nuclear power.

Life and career

Early life and education 
Sakata was born in Tokyo, Japan on January 18, 1911, to a family that held a tradition of public service. At the time of Sakata's birth, Mikita was secretary to Prime Minister Katsura Tarō, who became Sakata's godfather. While attending Kōnan Middle School in Hyōgo Prefecture in 1924, Sakata was taught by the physicist Bunsaku Arakatsu. During his time as a student at Kōnan High School from 1926 to 1929, Sakata attended a lecture given by the influential physicist Jun Ishiwara. Sakata also became closely acquainted with Katō Tadashi, who would later co-translate Friedrich Engels's 1883 unfinished work Dialectics of Nature into Japanese. According to Sakata, Dialectics of Nature and Vladimir Lenin's 1909 work Materialism and Empirio-criticism became formative works for his thinking.

Higher education and career 
Sakata got in to the Kyoto Imperial University in 1930.  When he was a second year student, Yoshio Nishina, a granduncle-in-law of Sakata, gave a lecture on quantum mechanics at the Kyoto Imperial University. Sakata became acquainted with Hideki Yukawa and Shin'ichirō Tomonaga, the first and the second Japanese Nobel laureates, through the lecture. After graduating from the university, Sakata worked with Tomonaga and Nishina at Rikagaku Kenkyusho (RIKEN) in 1933 and moved to Osaka Imperial University in 1934 to work with Yukawa.  Yukawa published his first paper on the meson theory in 1935 and Sakata closely collaborated with him for the developments of the meson theory.  Possible existence of the neutral nuclear force carrier particle  was postulated by them. Accompanied by Yukawa,  Sakata moved to Kyoto Imperial University as a lecturer in 1939.

Sakata and Inoue proposed their two-meson theory in 1942.  At the time, a charged particle discovered in the hard component cosmic rays was misidentified as the Yukawa's meson (nuclear force career particle).  The misinterpretation led to puzzles in the discovered cosmic ray particle.  Sakata and Inoue solved these puzzles by identifying the cosmic ray particle as a daughter charged fermion produced in the  decay.  A new neutral fermion was also introduced to allow  decay into fermions.

They then discussed the decay of the Yukawa particle, 
{|
|  || → ||  || + 
|}

Sakata and Inoue predicted correct spin assignment for the muon, and they also introduced the second neutrino. They treated it as a distinct particle from the beta decay neutrino, and anticipated correctly the three body decay of the muon. The English printing of Sakata-Inoue's two-meson theory paper was delayed until 1946,
one year before the experimental discovery of π → μν decay.

Sakata moved to Nagoya Imperial University as a professor in October 1942 and remained there until his death.  The name of the university was changed to Nagoya University in October 1947 after the end of the Pacific War (1945). Sakata reorganized his research group in Nagoya to be administrated under the democracy principle after the War.

Sakata stayed at the Niels Bohr Institute from May to October 1954 at the invitation of N. Bohr and C. Møller. During his stay, Sakata gave a talk introducing works of young Japanese particle physics researchers, especially emphasizing an empirical relation found by Nakano and Nishijima, which is now known as the Nakano-Nishijima-Gell-Mann (NNG) rule
among the strongly interacting particles (hadrons).

After Sakata returned to Nagoya, Sakata and his Nagoya group started researches trying to uncover the physics behind the NNG rule.  Sakata then proposed his Sakata Model
in 1956, which explains the NNG rule by postulating the fundamental building blocks of all strongly interacting particles are the proton, the neutron and the lambda baryon. The positively charged pion is made out of a proton and an antineutron, in a manner similar to the Fermi-Yang composite Yukawa meson
model,
while the positively charged kaon is composed of a proton and an anti-lambda, succeeding to explain the NNG rule in the Sakata model.  Aside from the integer charges, the proton, neutron, and lambda have similar properties as the up quark, down quark, and strange quark respectively.

In 1959, Ikeda, Ogawa and Ohnuki
and, independently, Yamaguchi
found out the U(3) symmetry in the Sakata model.  The U(3) symmetry provides a mathematical descriptions of hadrons in the eightfold way
idea (1961) of Murray Gell-Mann.  Sakata's model was superseded by the quark model, proposed by Gell-Mann and George Zweig in 1964, which keeps the U(3) symmetry, but made the constituents fractionally charged and rejected the idea that they could be identified with observed particles. Still, within Japan, integer charged quark models parallel to Sakata's were used until the 1970s, and are still used as effective descriptions in certain domains.

Sakata's model was used in Harry J. Lipkin's book "Lie Groups for Pedestrians" (1965).
The Sakata model and its SU(3) symmetry were also explained in the textbook "Weak Interaction of Elementary Particles", L.B.Okun (1965).

In 1959, Gamba, Marshak and Okubo
found Sakata's baryon triplet (proton, neutron and lambda baryon) bears striking similarity to the lepton triplet (neutrino, electron and muon) in the weak interaction aspects.
In order to explain the physics behind this similarity in the composite model framework, in 1960, Sakata expanded his composite model to include leptons with his Nagoya University associates Maki, Nakagawa, and Ohnuki.
The expanded model was termed “Nagoya Model”.  Shortly thereafter the existence of two kinds of neutrinos was experimentally confirmed.  In 1962, Maki, Nakagawa and Sakata,
and also Katayama, Matumoto, Tanaka and Yamada
accommodated the two distinct types of neutrino into the composite model framework.

In his 1962 paper with Maki and Nakagawa, they used the Gell-Mann-Levy proposal of modified universality to define the weak mixing angle that later became known as Cabibbo angle; and extended it to the leptons, clearly distinguishing neutrino weak and mass eigenstates,  thus defining the neutrino flavor mixing angle as well as predicting neutrino flavor oscillations. The neutrino flavor mixing matrix is now named Maki–Nakagawa–Sakata matrix.  The nontrivial neutrino mixing as introduced in the Maki–Nakagawa–Sakata paper is now experimentally confirmed through the neutrino oscillation experiments.

Influences
The U(3) symmetry found first in the Sakata model gave a guiding principle to construct the quark model of Gell-Mann and Zweig.  The two-meson theory of Sakata and Inoue became well-recognized in the world around 1950.

The 2008 physics Nobel laureates Yoichiro Nambu, Toshihide Maskawa and Makoto Kobayashi, who received their awards for work on symmetry breaking, all came under his tutelage and influence. The baryonic mixing in the weak current in the Nagoya Model was the inspiration for the later Cabibbo–Kobayashi–Maskawa matrix of 1973, which specifies the mismatch of quantum states of quarks, when they propagate freely and when they take part in weak interactions. Physicists however, generally attribute the introduction of a third generation of quarks (the "top" and "bottom" quarks) into the Standard Model of the elementary particles to that 1973 paper by Kobayashi and Maskawa.

The neutrino oscillation phenomena, as predicted by Maki, Nakagawa and Sakata, has been experimentally confirmed (2015 Nobel prize in physics).

Kent Staley (2004) describes the historical background to their paper, emphasizing the largely forgotten role of theorists at Nagoya University and the "Nagoya model" they developed. Several of the authors of the Nagoya model embraced the philosophy of dialectical materialism, and he discusses the role that such metaphysical commitments play in physical theorizing. Both theoretical and experimental developments that generated great interest in Japan, and ultimately stimulated Kobayashi and Maskawa's 1973 work, went almost entirely unnoticed in the U.S. The episode exemplifies both the importance of untestable "themata" in developing new theories, and the difficulties that may arise, when two parts of a research community work in relative isolation from one another.

Missed out on Nobel Prize
Shoichi Sakata's "Sakata model" inspired Murray Gell-Mann and George Zweig's quark model, but the 1969 prize was only awarded to Murray Gell-Mann. Afterward, Ivar Waller, the member of Nobel Committee for Physics was sorry that Sakata had not received a prize.

In September 1970, Hideki Yukawa politely wrote to Waller informing him that Sakata had been ill when the nomination was written; since then, his condition had worsened significantly. Three weeks later, Sakata died. Yukawa informed Waller that a prize to Sakata would have brought him much honor and encouragement. He, then, in the name of leading Japanese particle physicists, asked to know what the Nobel committee thought of Sakata's merits, for that would perhaps bring them consolation.

Honors
 Asahi Prize 1948
 Imperial Prize of the Japan Academy 1950
 Order of the Sacred Treasure (瑞宝章 Zuihōshō) 1970

References

Further reading
 Nussbaum, Louis-Frédéric and Käthe Roth. (2005).  Japan encyclopedia. Cambridge: Harvard University Press. ; OCLC 58053128

External links
Theoretical Physics and Dialectics of Nature - June 1947
Philosophy and Methodology of Present-Day Science - 1968
Engels’ “Dialektik der Natur” - July 1969
CP Violation and Flavour Mixing

1911 births
1970 deaths
Japanese Marxists
Japanese physicists
Academic staff of Osaka University
Academic staff of Kyoto University
Academic staff of Nagoya University
Osaka University alumni
Laureates of the Imperial Prize
Riken personnel